The Picture of the Last Man to Die is a black and white photograph taken by Robert Capa during the battle for Leipzig, representing an American soldier, Raymond J. Bowman, aged 21 years old, after being killed by a German sniper, on 18 April 1945, shortly before the end of World War II in Europe.

History
Raymond J. Bowman was an American soldier born in Rochester, New York, who had arrived to Great Britain in January 1944, in preparation for Operation Overlord. After his landing, he served and was wounded in France, on 3 August 1944. He also served in Belgium and Germany. He reached the rank of private first class during this time. He was a member of a platoon of machine gunners who entered a building in Leipzig, and set positions to cover foot soldiers of the U.S. 2nd Infantry who were arriving to a bridge. Soldiers Bowman and Lehman Riggs, of Cookeville, TN, took positions in an open balcony with a clear view of the bridge. One fired the gun, while the other soldier fed it. Riggs came inside, leaving Bowman alone firing the gun. When he was reloading the gun, he was shot in the cheek by a sniper's bullet who came from the street below and he crumpled on the floor, already dead.
    
War photographer Robert Capa climbed through the balcony window to the flat, where he took a picture of the dead soldier, who laid in the open door, still with the Luftwaffe sheepskin helmet he had looted on his head. He took other pictures showing how his blood spread on the floor, while other soldiers attended to him and to his fellow gunner.

The photographs were published on the Life magazine on 14 May 1945, shortly after Germany surrender, with the caption The Picture of the Last Man to Die, which became his official title. They became some of the most iconic images of the World War II.

Two years later, Capa said in an interview that “It was a very clean, somehow very beautiful death and I think that’s what I remember most from the war”.

On 17 April 2016, Leipzig renamed a section of the Jahnallee (Jahn Avenue), the street in front of the apartment where Bowman was killed as Bowmanstraße (Bowman Street) and another section as Capastraße (Capa Street). The apartment was saved from demolition and renamed Capa House, and now holds a memorial with Robert Capa pictures and information on Private Bowman.
Lehman Riggs returned to Leipzig in 2012 and again in 2016 at age 96 to attend the dedication ceremony. Riggs died August 19, 2020 in Cookeville, Tennessee, at the age of 101.

Public collections
A print of the photograph is held at the collection of the International Center of Photography, in New York.

References

1945 photographs
Photographs by Robert Capa
Conflicts in 1945
1945 in Germany
Battles of World War II involving Germany
1945 works
1945 in art
Black-and-white photographs
World War II photographs